The Marion County Courthouse is a Beaux-Arts style building in Fairmont, West Virginia, in the United States.  The courthouse was constructed from 1897 to 1900, and was designed by the architectural firm of Yost & Packard of Columbus, Ohio.  Its dome is topped by a figure carrying the scales of justice.

The courthouse, located at the intersection of Adams and Jefferson Streets in downtown Fairmont, and the adjacent American Foursquare-style sheriff's residence, were jointly added to the National Register of Historic Places in 1979 for their architectural, artistic and governmental significance.

See also
List of Registered Historic Places in West Virginia

References

Beaux-Arts architecture in West Virginia
Buildings and structures in Marion County, West Virginia
Clock towers in West Virginia
County courthouses in West Virginia
Courthouses on the National Register of Historic Places in West Virginia
Government buildings completed in 1900
Yost and Packard buildings
National Register of Historic Places in Marion County, West Virginia
American Foursquare architecture in West Virginia
Fairmont, West Virginia